Imao may refer to:

 IMAO, Internet slang standing for "In my arrogant opinion"
 IMAO.us, a conservative American political humor blog founded by Frank J. Fleming 
 Instituto Miguel Ángel de Occidente, a private school in the Guadalajara area, Mexico

See also
 Imaw, fictional character in Encantadia